This is a list of children's animated television series (including internet television series); that is, animated programs originally targeted towards audiences aged 12 and under in mind.

This list does not include Japanese, Chinese, or Korean series, as children's animation is much more common in these regions.

2010s

United States

Canada

Co-productions

References

2010s animated television series
animated
Childrens 2010s
Childrens animated series 2010s
 2010s